Guillermo Jorge Almada Alves (born June 18, 1966), known as Guillermo Almada, is a Uruguayan professional football manager and former player, currently in charge of Liga MX club Pachuca.

Managerial statistics

Honours

Player
Defensor Sporting 
Uruguayan Primera División: 1987, 1991

Manager
River Plate (Montevideo) 
 Torneo Preparación: 2012
Barcelona de Guayaquil

 Ecuadorian Serie A: 2015–16

Pachuca
Liga MX: Apertura 2022

Notes

External links
 
 Guillermo Almada at playmakerstats.com (English version of ceroacero.es)
 

1969 births
Living people
Uruguayan footballers
Uruguayan expatriate footballers
Uruguayan football managers
Defensor Sporting players
Club Atlético River Plate (Montevideo) players
Racing Club de Montevideo players
Montevideo Wanderers F.C. players
Centro Atlético Fénix players
Tacuarembó F.C. players
Huracán Buceo players
C.A. Cerro players
C.A. Progreso players
Aurora F.C. players
Barcelona S.C. managers
América de Cali footballers
O'Higgins F.C. footballers
Uruguayan Primera División players
Chilean Primera División players
Categoría Primera A players
Expatriate football managers in Ecuador
Expatriate football managers in Mexico
Expatriate footballers in Bolivia
Expatriate footballers in Colombia
River Plate Montevideo managers
Association football forwards